Yuan Hong (born 23 August 1982), also known as Justin Yuan, is a Chinese actor.

Biography
Yuan was born in Wuhan, Hubei. He graduated from Shanghai Theatre Academy in 2001.

Career
Yuan gained attention with his role as Yang Kang in The Legend of the Condor Heroes (2008). His character, who was traditionally portrayed as an antagonist in previous film and television adaptations, was reinterpreted as a morally ambiguous and romantic antihero, leaving a deep impression on many people. He earned widespread recognition with his role as the thirteenth prince in the hit time-slip historical drama, Scarlet Heart (2011).

Yuan earned positive acclaim for his performance in the period drama, Ordinary World (2015), based on the novel of the same title by Lu Yi; and won the Best Supporting Actor award at the Golden Ox Awards. He also won the Best Actor award at the Huading Awards for his role in the historical romance drama Singing All Along (2016) co-starring Ruby Lin.

Personal life
Yuan Hong married Princess Jieyou co-star Zhang Xinyi in Germany in May 2016.

Filmography

Film

Television series

Variety show

|2019
|‘’Mr.Housework’’
|做家务的男人
|Cast member

Discography

Awards and nominations

References

1982 births
Living people
Male actors from Wuhan
Chinese male stage actors
Shanghai Theatre Academy alumni
21st-century Chinese male actors
Chinese male film actors
Chinese male television actors
Participants in Chinese reality television series